The 2015 Billboard Latin Music Awards, recognizes the best-selling albums, songs, and performers in Latin music in 2014, as determined by their chart performance on Billboards weekly charts. The ceremony was broadcast live on Telemundo on April 30, 2015, from the BankUnited Center at the University of Miami in Coral Gables, Florida. 

American singer-songwriter Romeo Santos won 10 awards including Artist of the Year. Spanish artist Enrique Iglesias was also a multiple winner in categories such as Hot Latin Song of the Year for "Bailando" and Latin Pop Album of the Year for Sex and Love. Special awards were also handed out. Brazilian singer-songwriter Roberto Carlos received the Lifetime Achievement Award and Mexican-American Carlos Santana was honored with the Billboard "Spirit of Hope Award".

Winners and nominees
The nominees for the Billboard Latin Music Awards were announced on February 9, 2015, during the broadcast of the morning show Un Nuevo Día. American singer Romeo Santos received the most nominations, with 21; Spanish artist Enrique Iglesias earned 19 nominations. Santos and Iglesias broke the record held by reggaeton performers Tito El Bambino and Don Omar in 2010 and 2013, respectively, for the most nominated act in a single ceremony. Colombian artist J Balvin was nominated seven times, while Mexican acts  Julion Alvarez y Su Norteño Banda and Banda Sinaloense MS de Sergio Lizarraga received six. Five-time nominated artists include Mexican singer-songwriter Marco Antonio Solís, American band Santana and American singer Prince Royce. The nominees and winners are determined by sales, radio airplay, streaming and social data, from February 1, 2014 –January 31, 2015, as it is compiled by Billboard magazine every week. 

Santos resulted the most awarded performer, earning ten accolades, including Artist of the Year, Songwriter of the Year, Producer of the Year, Top Latin Album (Formula, Vol. 2) and Tropical Album of the Year (Formula, Vol. 2), among others. Iglesias received nine awards, including Latin Pop Album of the Year (Sex & Love), Latin Pop Song, Airplay Song, Hot Latin Song, and Streaming Song of the Year for the single "Bailando". Brazilian singer-songwriter Roberto Carlos received the Lifetime Achievement Award and Mexican-American artist Carlos Santana was honored with the Billboard "Spirit of Hope Award".

Winners are listed first, highlighted in boldface and indicated with a double-dagger.

Artists

Singles

Albums

Record labels

Writers, producers and publishers

Ceremony
The American telecast on Telemundo drew in an average 6.4 million people during its three hours of length, with the network ranking first in the ratings in the 18–34 demographic in New York, Miami, Houston and Phoenix, regardless of language. The telecast included musical performances by several artist including the opening number by American singer Marc Anthony and Gente De Zona with the track "La Gozadera"; American singer Jennifer Lopez sang a tribute medley to the Tejano artist Selena, featuring the brother, sister and husband (A.B. Quintanilla, Suzette Quintanilla, Chris Perez, respectively) of the latter. Dutch act Afrojack and American artist Ne-Yo joined Puerto Rican singer-songwriter Luis Fonsi, while Brazilian artist Roberto Carlos also performed. Reggaeton performer Wisin along Carlos Vives and Daddy Yankee gathered on stage to sing "Nota de Amor"; Mexican-American artist Carlos Santana was joined by Puerto-Rican singer Juanes to perform "Black Magic Woman" and "La Flaca".

References

Billboard Latin Music Awards
Latin Billboard Music Awards
Latin Billboard Music Awards
Latin Billboard Music Awards
Latin Billboard Music